Neuromuscular medicine is a subspecialty of neurology and physiatry that focuses the diagnosis and management of neuromuscular diseases. The field encompasses issues related to both diagnosis and management of these conditions, including rehabilitation interventions to optimize the quality of life of individuals with these conditions. This field encompasses disorders that impact both adults and children. Neuromuscular disease can be caused by autoimmune disorders, genetic or hereditary disorders such as channelopathies, or neurodegenerative diseases. Because they frequently have no cure, the focus is managing the condition to provide improvements in the patients quality. Rehabilitation robotics is a new frontier for neurological rehabilitation treatments.

Diagnostic tools

The tools used to diagnose neuromuscular disorders include nerve and muscle biopsies, electromyography, nerve conduction studies, and molecular and genetic tests.

See also 
 List of neuromuscular disorders
 Muscle
 Motor neuron diseases

References

External links
 American Association of Neuromuscular & Electrodiagnostic Medicine

Neurophysiology
Neurology